The following is an overview of the events of 1888 in film, including a list of films released and notable births.

Events
 George Eastman files for a patent for his photographic film.
 Thomas Edison meets with Eadweard Muybridge who proposes a scheme for sound film (February 27, West Orange, New Jersey).
 Étienne-Jules Marey starts work on his chronophotographe camera with 90 mm wide roll paper film.
 Charles-Émile Reynaud patents his Théâtre Optique which uses a kind of perforated film to create an animated show.

Films

Roundhay Garden Scene, Accordion Player and Traffic Crossing Leeds Bridge, filmed by Louis Aimé Augustin Le Prince in Leeds, United Kingdom, using paper "stripping" film and paper negative film.
Horse and Rider Jumping Over an Obstacle (Pferd und Reiter Springen über ein Hindernis) and other sequences, shot by Ottomar Anschütz in Germany.

Births

References

External links

 1888  at The Internet Movie Database

 
Film by year
Articles containing video clips